is a former Japanese football player and manager.

Playing career
Mizukoshi was born in Uda on January 15, 1975. After graduating from Tenri University, he joined Prefectural Leagues club Takada FC (later Diablossa Takada FC) in 1997. In October 1997, he moved to Regional Leagues club Albirex Niigata. He played many matches and the club was promoted to Japan Football League from 1998 and J2 League from 1999. In 2000, he moved to Japan Football League club Jatco TT. In 2001, he moved to Netherlands and joined EHC Hoensbroek. In June 2001, he returned to Japan and joined J2 club Ventforet Kofu. He became a regular player as right midfielder. Although the club finished at bottom place in 2001, through at middle place, the club won the 3rd place in 2005 and was promoted to J1 League from 2006. However he moved to Regional Leagues club New Wave Kitakyushu in 2006 and played many matches. In October 2006, he moved to Regional Leagues club TDK on loan. In 2007, he returned to New Wave Kitakyushu. In 2008, he moved to his first club Diablossa Takada FC in Regional Leagues. In November 2008, he moved to Prefectural Leagues club Nara Club. The club was promoted to Regional Leagues from 2009. He retired end of 2010 season.

Coaching career
In October 2013, Mizukoshi became a manager for Regional Leagues club Nara Club as Jiro Yabe successor. He managed the club until end of 2013 season

Club statistics

References

External links

1975 births
Living people
Tenri University alumni
Association football people from Nara Prefecture
Japanese footballers
J2 League players
Japan Football League (1992–1998) players
Albirex Niigata players
Jatco SC players
Ventforet Kofu players
Giravanz Kitakyushu players
Blaublitz Akita players
Nara Club players
Association football midfielders
EHC Hoensbroek players